The name Higos has been used to name four tropical cyclones in the northwestern Pacific Ocean. The name was contributed by the United States of America, and means fig in the Chamorro language.

 Typhoon Higos (2002) (T0221, 25W) – struck Japan.
 Tropical Storm Higos (2008) (T0817, 21W, Pablo)
 Typhoon Higos (2015) (T1502, 02W) – an early strong typhoon of the 2015 season.
 Tropical Storm Higos (2020) (T2007, 08W, Helen) - strong tropical storm that affected, at peak intensity, Hong Kong, Macau, and China.

Pacific typhoon set index articles